Bornarevo (Bulgarian: Борнарево) is a village in western Bulgaria. Its located in Oblast Pernik, Obshtina Radomir.

References 

 www.grao.bg

Villages in Pernik Province